Moshe Yitzhak Gueron (b. 20 March 1926 - 11 December 2017) was an Israeli physician and researcher, innovator, scientist, medical educator, Professor of Cardiology at the Medical School for International Health at Ben-Gurion University of the Negev, a pioneer in the field of Cardiology. He founded and managed the Division of Cardiology in the Soroka Medical Center for 30 years. His research and clinical works gained broad international recognition. Gueron played a central role in developing global medicine, and he is mainly known for his work on the treatment of heart patients with cardiovascular manifestations of severe scorpion sting.

Biography

Gueron was born in Sofia, Bulgaria to Bechora (née Castro) and Yitzhak Gueron. He attended a Catholic French college, but was sent to a transit camp by the Nazis in 1943. The Bulgarian government refused to permit the deportation of Bulgarian Jews, and by 1944, Prof. Gueron returned to Sofia and entered medical school at The University of Sofia. After Israel won independence in 1948, he emigrated from Bulgaria to Israel and lived in Jaffa with his parents.

In 1949 he joined the first medical school class of Hebrew University in Jerusalem. There he met his future colleagues and past friends from Bulgaria: Prof. Pascal Tiberin, Prof. Menachem Hirsch, Prof. Isaac (Izzy) Djerassi, a Philadelphia-based medical researcher and clinician in the fields of hematology and oncology, and Prof. Joseph Rosenfeld. Gueron graduated summa cum laude in 1951.

After his graduation, Gueron started his fellowship in internal medicine in Hadassah Hospital Tel Aviv and a few months later he already served as senior internal doctor. In 1956, shortly after his graduation in internal medicine, Gueron came to the conclusion that there is no future for him in internal medicine. Drawn by his conclusion he left internal medicine and in 1958 he turned to specialize in cardiology. He arrived to America to the school of medicine in University of Cincinnati at the invitation of Prof. Noble O. Fowler.

Return to Israel

One year after his return to Israel in 1961, Gueron indeed settled in Beersheba and received a job in Soroka Medical Center. Prof. Yosef Stern, Soroka's first director general supported Gueron's idea to establish a department of cardiology in the hospital. Two months after his arrival, Prof. Gueron has already started to perform heart catheterization in patients. Gueron is known for performing the first successful heart catheterization in Israel.

Prof. Gueron started to engage in cardiac muscle-related events in patients at the advice of Prof. Wilhelmina Cohen, the then-director and founder of Soroka's Pediatric Division, which while treating a young Bedouin boy who was stung by a deathstalker, discovered symptoms of shock, ventricular arrhythmias and ventricular tachycardia. This issue has evolved into a large-scale, great depth research by Prof. Gueron and his team, who were the first in the field of medicine to have found that yellow scorpion venom evokes potent cardiovascular responses in humans. Gueron's work, his treatments in patients and studies on severity of scorpion stings were published in the largest medical publications on a global scale.

Medical career

Gueron was appointed Professor at Soroka Medical Center in 1967, and was involved in the development of the techniques of heart and heart-lung treatment. Gueron is best known for a research he has managed regarding the treatment of scorpion evenomation and its affection on the human's heart. During his 40 years research, thousands of stung patients were reviewed. Gueron's research has shown that thirty-four patients with severe scorpion sting were reviewed and pertinent data related to the cardiovascular system such as hypertension, peripheral vascular collapse, congestive heart failure or pulmonary edema were analyzed. The electrocardiograms of 28 patients were reviewed, 14 patients showed "early myocardial infarction-like" pattern. The urinary catecholamine metabolites were investigated in 12 patients with scorpion sting. Vanylmandelic acid was elevated in seven patients and the total free epinephrine and norepinephrine in eight. Six of these 12 patients displayed the electrocardiographic "myocardial infarction-like" pattern. Nine patients died and the pathologic lesions of the myocardium were reviewed in seven. The anticipated time line is within three years depending on successful animal trials. Gueron was described hypertension, pulmonary oedema with hypertension, hypotension, pulmonary oedema with hypotension and rhythm disturbances as five different syndromes that may dominate the clinical picture in scorpion sting victim. He suggested that all patients with cardiac symptoms should be admitted to an intensive cardiac unit. Gueron was questioned regarding the value of giving antivenin, and he replied that although it is freely available, all cases of scorpion sting are treated without it, and there had not been a single fatality in 1989. In 1990, he reported poor contractility with low ejection fraction, decreased systolic left ventricular performance, lowered fractional percentage shortening observed in echocardiographic and radionuclide angiographic study. In fact, Gueron's research tended to prove the irrelevance of antivenin in patients with severe scorpion sting.

Retirement

Gueron was employed by Soroka Medical Center from 1962 until 1992 and operated on more than 100,000 patients. Having retired from performing cardiology at the age of 67, he continued to act as a consultant.

References

Publications

Israeli cardiologists
Scientists from Sofia
Bulgarian Jews in Israel
Bulgarian emigrants to Israel
Israeli people of Bulgarian-Jewish descent
1926 births
2017 deaths